Eudocima cocalus, the cocalus fruit piercing moth, is a moth of the  family Erebidae. It is found in the north-eastern part of the Himalaya, to Sundaland and east to Queensland, Australia and the Solomons.

The wingspan is about 100 mm.

The larvae feed on Cocculus species. The adults are a pest in lychee and carambola orchards. They pierce the fruit in order to suck the juice.

Gallery

External links
Australian Caterpillars
Moths of Borneo
Species info

Eudocima
Moths described in 1777